Nahiem Ajmal (born ), more commonly known as Mufti Abu Layth, is a YouTuber, Birmingham-based British Pakistani Muslim cleric. He has received criticism from conservative Islamic scholars for his unconventional thinking.

Education
Ajmal studied Islamic theology first in Damascus and then in Karachi, where he memorised the Qur'an. Besides this, he has studied psychology He speaks five languages, including Urdu and Arabic.

Views

Jurisprudence (Fiqh)
Although he is classically trained in the Maliki tradition, Ajmal does not subscribe to any particular school of thought nor identifies with any particular Islamic denomination. Despite his conservative education, he prefers to choose what he believes is a more logical understanding about many of the more traditional codes by which Muftis are expected to abide by. He is known to employ a satirical approach to fiqh that appeals to many Muslims, shunning mainstream, widely held positions. In particular, he is known for issuing fatawa (Islamic legal opinions) on social media where he has a large following. In a first for Muslim social media, Abu Layth made a video titled "Bukharigate" aimed at proving that the hadith are not as reliable as deemed.

Some of his more famous verdicts include: hijab not being a mandatory clothing for Muslim women, that Muslims are permitted to draw figures and the permissibility of celebrating non-Muslim holidays such as Christmas and Halloween. Other verdicts ascribed to him are that beards can be groomed and that it is permitted to have tattoos. Another major difference between him and traditional scholars is in the age of  Muhammad's wife Aisha, where he does not support the view that she was nine at the time of marriage.

Theology
In his sessions he also answers theological questions, such as, "Do we accept mutawatir hadith if they contradict the Qur'an?" He rejects the Second Coming of Jesus and the belief in the Islamic Antichrist, as well as the concepts of evil eye, black magic, and jinn possession. Theologically, he does not align with literalist schools of thought that believe in anthropomorphism. He also adopts an allegorical approach towards the Quran's miracle stories. His hermeneutical approach is similar to that of other modernist scholars, in that laws were designed to reflect the day and age in which they came, and do not need to be the same in every era.

Politics
Ajmal supports peaceful relations between Israel and Palestine via a Two-state solution. He suggests the two-state solution, arguing that such a pragmatic attempt at resolution is not un-Islamic. He argues to this effect that Islam has for a long time had the goal of mitigating suffering and establishing justice, even at times with compromise.

Ajmal has been invited to the White House in recognition of his anti-terror work. He has also been described as a key figure locally in the UK's counter-extremism Prevent strategy.

Criticism
Due to some of his views, he has caused criticism and denunciations. Mohammad Yasir has labelled Ajmal "Dajjal" due to Ajmal's satirical approach and boldness in front of fundamentalist peachers. Others accuse him of "mocking the deen" and have stated he has "no gheerah", with some criticising in particular his choice of topics in his live streams, especially when he covers topics with a rational point of view. In addition, he has been criticised for his alleged advisory role with the now defunct Quillium Foundation.

Controversy
During the Park View School Trojan Horse scandal, Ajmal was a part-time tutor at the school. In a statement, the police revealed however that Ajmal was involved in Prevent. After this was revealed, Ajmal was promptly suspended by the school. The police's statement, Ajmal argued, had jeopardised his safety.

In 2014, while working as a religious teacher at Park View school he was arrested by West Midlands Police for possessing extreme pornography under the Criminal Justice and Immigration Act 2008, but was not found guilty. In 2015, he was associated with a public officer that was charged with misconduct.

See also

Notes

References

 
 

 
 
 
 
 

Living people
English Muslims
Year of birth missing (living people)